Phenyldichloroarsine, also known by its wartime name phenyl Dick and its NATO abbreviation PD, is an organic arsenical vesicant and vomiting agent developed by Germany and France for use as a chemical warfare agent during World War I. The agent is known by multiple synonyms and is technically classified as a vesicant, or blister agent.

History
PD was prepared during 1917–18 in Germany and France, during World War II it was prepared in Germany.

Chemical characteristics

General
Phenyldichloroarsine is an odorless, colorless substance that can form hydrochloric acid upon contact with water. The reaction with water is very slow, the substance sinks, and the reaction is considered non-hazardous. Another product of hydrolysis is phenylarsenious acid, which is a severe irritant to the mucous membranes and skin. In an impure state, phenyldichloroarsine may have a slight brown color, in its purest form though there is no color and the substance has an oily texture. An impure solution of PD also emits a characteristically unpleasant horseradish or garlic-like odor, which is detectable at 0.1 ppm.

Phenyldichloroarsine is one of four organic arsenicals, the other three are lewisite (L), methyldichloroarsine (MD), and ethyldichloroarsine (ED). PD is considered an analog of lewisite. At its freezing point, -20 °C, PD becomes a microcrystalline solid mass. The compound has a C-metalloid bond between the phenyl group and the arsenic and two covalent bonds between the arsenic and the chlorine.

Synthesis
Phenyldichloroarsine is produced by reacting benzene with arsenic trichloride. Anhydrous aluminum chloride acts as a catalyst in this reaction.

Uses
Phenyldichloroarsine is an obsolete chemical warfare agent and is classified as a vesicant or a vomiting/incapacitating agent. It was used as a weapon during World War I, where it showed itself as less effective than other vomiting agents. Phenyldichloroarsine is an arsenical vesicant which can be mixed with mustard agents for use in chemical warfare.
PD was developed for use in wet environments, because of its tendency to persist in cool and shaded areas. Phenyldichloroarsine can have a persistence lasting anywhere from 2 to 7 days under usual environmental conditions. In open areas, it is more useful as a vomiting agent but in closed-in areas, such as basements, trenches and caves, it is highly effective because of its "extreme" vapor density. Phenyldichloroarsine has also been used by banks and other high-security facilities to defend against security breaches.

Biological effects
PD damages the eyes, lungs, throat and nasal membranes. PD immediately affects the eyes and blindness can result, though it requires high doses. It also induces nausea and vomiting, an inhalation of as little as 5-50 milligrams can induce severe vomiting. Long-term exposure to PD can cause systemic damage by replacing calcium with arsenic, extensive bone marrow damage can also result. Due to PD being easily recognized in the field and a relatively fast rate for decontamination procedures to become effective, the chemical is not as useful as other blister agents. The blistering resultant from PD exposure may also be delayed, for as little as 30 minutes, or as long as 32 hours depending upon the concentration of the dose.

The molecular toxicology of PD is not well understood, but a 1986 U.S. Army-sponsored report did shed some light on that area. The Army report showed that PD penetrated the red blood cell membrane and interacted with something inside the cell. The study also found that hemoglobin was not responsible for "holding" the PD in its bond with the erythrocytes (red blood cells), instead glutathione was found to be a more likely interacting with PD inside the cell .

See also 
Diphenylchlorarsine

References 

Arsenical vesicants
Vomiting agents
Organoarsenic chlorides
Phenyl compounds
Arsenic(III) compounds